Antonio dos Santos (14 April 1932 – 26 March 2018) was a Roman Catholic bishop.

Dos Santos was ordained to the priesthood in 1956. He served as titular bishop of Tabbora and as auxiliary bishop of the Roman Catholic Diocese of Aveiro, Portugal, from 1976 to 1979. He then served as bishop of the Roman Catholic Diocese of Guarda, Portugal, from 1979 to 2005.

Notes

1932 births
2018 deaths
21st-century Roman Catholic bishops in Portugal
20th-century Roman Catholic bishops in Portugal
People from Aveiro District
People from Guarda District